Big & Beautiful is the third studio album by the hip hop group the Fat Boys, released in May 1986 through Sutra Records; it was their last release on the label.

Track listing
"Sex Machine" (James Brown, Bobby Byrd, Ron Lenhoff) – 4:46	
"Go For It" (Mark Morales, Gordon Pickett, Jalil Hutchins) – 4:33	
"Breakdown" (Mark Morales, Damon Wimbley, Darren Robinson, Tony Moran, Albert Cabrera) – 4:12	
"Double-O Fat Boys" (Dave Ogrin) – 5:01	
"Big & Beautiful" (Dave Ogrin, Mark Morales, Damon Wimbley, Darren Robinson) – 4:25	
"Rapp Symphony (In C-Minor)" (Mark Morales, Gordon Pickett) – 4:01	
"Human Beat Box, Part III" (Damon Wimbley, Darren Robinson, Mark Morales) – 4:12	
"In The House" (Mark Morales, Gordon Pickett) – 4:12	
"Beat Box Is Rockin'" (Damon Wimbley, Darren Robinson, Mark Morales, Gary Rottger) – 3:36

Personnel
 Musicians: Fresh Gordon, Doug Grama, Jeff Johnson, Mark Morales, Dave Ogrin, Darren Robinson, Gary Rottger
 Background vocals: Peter Lewis, Cindy Mizelle, Peter Sturge, Audrey Wheeler, Alyson Williams
 Recording and mixing engineers: Doug Grama, Dave Ogrin, Bobby Di Riso
 Mastering: Frankford/Wayne Mastering Labs
 Executive producer: Charles Stettler
 Photography: Howard Menken
 Design: Lynda West

Charts

Singles

References

External links
 The Fat Boys-Big & Beautiful at Discogs

1986 albums
The Fat Boys albums